Brou may refer to:
 Brou, Eure-et-Loir, a village and commune in France
 Brou-sur-Chantereine, a village and commune in Seine-et-Marne, France
 Brou people, a Khmer Loeu ethnic group in Cambodia

See also
 Royal Monastery of Brou, in Bourg-en-Bresse, France
 Lake Brou - between Tuross Head and Narooma, New South Wales, (Australia), about 30 km south of Broulee.
 Broulee, New South Wales
 Broulee Island Nature Reserve
Brau (disambiguation)